Ramatu Yakubu (born 27 March 1999) is a Nigerian badminton player. Yakubu won bronze medals at the 2018 African Youth Games in the girls' singles and team events.

Career 
In 2017, Yakubu competed at the Benin International badminton championships in Cotonou, Benin Republic, and finished as semi-finalists in the women's doubles and mixed doubles events. She later finished as women's doubles runner-up in Lagos International partnered with Zainab Momoh. In 2020, she was registered by the Badminton Federation of Nigeria to compete at the 2020 All Africa Women's Team Championships, but she missed the competition due to team visa application was delayed by the Egyptian Embassy.

Achievements

African Youth Games 
Girls' singles

BWF International Challenge/Series 
Women's doubles

  BWF International Challenge tournament
  BWF International Series tournament
  BWF Future Series tournament

References

External links 
 

1999 births
Living people
Nigerian female badminton players
21st-century Nigerian women